The Nakdonggang River or Nakdonggang is the longest river in South Korea, and passes through major cities such as Daegu and Busan. It takes its name from its role as the eastern border of the Gaya confederacy during Korea's Three Kingdoms Era.

Geography
The Nakdonggang flows from the Taebaek Mountains to the South Sea or Korean Strait, which separates Korea from Japan. The river originates from the junction of the Cheolamcheon and Hwangjicheon streams in Dongjeom-dong, Taebaek city, Gangwon province. The width of the river ranges from only a few metres in its upper reaches, to several hundred metres towards its estuary.

Major tributaries include the Yeong, Geumho, and Nam rivers. Together with its tributaries, the Nakdonggang drains most of North Gyeongsang and South Gyeongsang provinces, along with small portions of North Jeolla, South Jeolla, and Gangwon.

History

The Nakdonggang River has played an important role throughout Korean history. The river basin has been a favored dwelling-place for as long as people have inhabited the Korean peninsula. Numerous Neolithic remains have been found in the valley.

Around the 1st century, the valley is believed to have been inhabited by the Byeonhan confederacy tribes. During the Three Kingdoms period, the Gaya confederacy controlled the valley, until they were overrun by Silla in 562. These states exploited the river's potential for navigation and commerce, operating a thriving trade in armor and weapons with neighboring countries, including Yamato period Japan. Through the Silla, Goryeo, and Joseon periods, the river continued to serve as a major transportation corridor in the Gyeongsang region. It was especially used for transporting fresh seafood inland, such as mackerel, which were salted and dried in order to prevent them from spoiling. The city of Andong was the farthest inland the fish could be brought before going bad, so many people flocked there during the Joseon Dynasty to eat fish.

As a barrier to movement, the Nakdonggang River gained sudden prominence during the Korean War. The southern length of the river formed the western portion of the Pusan Perimeter, which the UN forces fought to maintain during the autumn of 1950. The bridge over the Nakdonggang River at Waegwan was blown up on August 3, 1950 in an effort to prevent North Korean forces from advancing on Daegu. A large number of South Korean refugees were killed in the explosion. Although some North Korean forces did cross the Nakdonggang River in places, for the most part the river still marks their furthest advance.

Nakdonggang river phenol contamination incident 

In 1991, there were two incidents where phenol was leaked into the river from Doosan Electronics. There were two leaks, the first thirty tons on March 14, 1991 and the second 1.3 tons on April 22. The phenol ended up at a water processing facility used for drinking water in Daegu and began to smell after becoming chlorophenol when the water was sanitized with chlorine.

Ecology
The Nakdonggang valley includes numerous floodplain wetlands, the most well-known of which are the Joonam Reservoirs near Changwon City and Upo Ramsar site, in Changnyeong County, South Gyeongsang. These wetlands, while significantly degraded and overdeveloped, still provide habitat to a significant number of rare and threatened species, most especially birds (such as the Baikal Teal, Anas formosa, and White-naped Crane, Grus vipio), fish and plants. Despite being home to the bustling Port of Busan, the Nakdonggang Estuary is also internationally important for waterbirds, despite recent ecologically-destructive developments including reclamation for housing and industry (e.g. the Busan New Port), the ongoing construction of a major bridge (the Miyeonji  Bridge) and most recently the threatened construction of the Korean Grand Canal project.

The Nakdonggang and its tributaries also serve as a major source of drinking water for the inhabitants of the river basin and others nearby.  However, water pollution due to domestic and agricultural wastewater remains a serious concern.

Economic role

Although all but the southernmost reaches of the Nakdonggang River have ceased to serve as a major commercial waterway, the river continues to feed those dwelling near it, both directly through fishing and indirectly through irrigation. Substantial amounts of snails and catfish are taken from the waters and used in local cuisine.

Near Andong, a series of massive hydroelectric dams have been constructed, creating a small chain of artificial lakes of which Andong Lake is the largest. These lakes also support a substantial recreational industry. Bass fishing is especially popular, since the lakes have been artificially stocked with bass.

In the early 2010s, the Nakdonggang River was to be part of former South Korean president Lee Myung Bak's canal project, the Grand Korean Waterway. The project would link the Nakdong with the Han River to the north, creating a shipping canal spanning length of the country, from Seoul to Busan. Encountering considerable controversy nationwide as well as from residents along the Nakdonggang, the Waterway project was scrapped by the end of Lee's presidency.

Festival 
Nakdonggang River Bicycle Festival - The Nakdong River Cultural Center hold bicycle festivals that everyone can enjoy the healthy leisure culture of local residents. It is composed of flat courses about 20Km in the vicinity of Eulsukdo and Nakdonggang River Cultural Center.

See also
Geography of South Korea
List of rivers of Asia
West Nakdong River

Notes

References

Bibliography
 .

 
Rivers of North Gyeongsang Province
Rivers of South Gyeongsang Province
Rivers of Busan